Afnán-i-Yazdí (‎, surnamed Vakílu'd-Dawlih; 18301909), also known as Ḥájí Mírzá Muḥammad-Taqí, was an eminent follower of Baháʼu'lláh, the founder of the Baháʼí Faith. He is identified as one of the nineteen Apostles of Baháʼu'lláh.

He was an Afnán, a cousin of the Báb and the chief builder of the first Baháʼí House of Worship in ʻIshqábád, present day Turkmenistan, which was initiated by ʻAbdu'l-Bahá in or about 1902.

References

External links
Hájí Mírzá Muhammad-Taqí - section from Memorials of the Faithful, p. 126.

Apostles of Baháʼu'lláh
Iranian Bahá'ís
1830 births
1909 deaths
19th-century Bahá'ís
20th-century Bahá'ís